Events in the year 1207 in Norway.

Incumbents
Monarch: Inge II Bårdsson

Events

Arts and literature

Births

Deaths
Erling Steinvegg, candidate of the Bagler to the Norwegian throne.

References

Norway